The Musqueam Indian Band is a First Nations band government in the Canadian province of British Columbia. It is the only First Nations band whose reserve community lies within the boundaries of the City of Vancouver.

Name 

The name Musqueam comes from the flowering plant , which grows in the Fraser River estuary. There is a  that has been passed on from generation to generation that explains how they became known as the  – People of the  plant. Their name is one of the ways that their historical connection to the land is highlighted.

They were warned as youth to be cautious and not go near or they would surely die. For this reason, the people of long ago named that place  (Musqueam – place of the ).

History 
The Musqueam people are the oldest known residents of Vancouver. The Great Marpole Midden (also known as the Eburne Site, or Great Fraser Midden), is an ancient Musqueam village and burial site located in what has been developed as the Marpole neighbourhood of Vancouver, British Columbia.

This area was also known as the Great Fraser Midden. The midden is a thousands-year old site from which as many as seventy-five human skeletal remains of Musqueam ancestors were excavated. Additionally, Musqueam ancestral belongings (commonly referred to as "artifacts") were also found in the area such as: stone and wooden tools, artwork, and biofacts such as shells and other animal remains. Formerly there was a second residential area near the current one, known in English as Mahlie.

The Musqueam's ancestors, the Coast Salish, have lived in the Fraser River estuary for thousands of years. Musqueam describes their traditional territory in their Musqueam Declaration, which was ratified by Musqueam community leaders June 10, 1976.

The Musqueam Declaration describes their traditional territory as follows: 

The area of the Musqueam Reserve is the closest that Hudson's Bay Company explorer Simon Fraser reached to the Strait of Georgia; he was driven back by hostile Musqueam who had had bad experiences with Europeans on ships just prior. Chief Whattlekainum of the Kwantlen warned Fraser of an impending attack, thereby saving his life.

Language 

The nearby Kwantlen and Katzie peoples just upriver share the same  dialect, while the upriver Sto:lo people speak another dialect,  (known as the Upriver Dialect). The Cowichan, Chemainus, Snuneymuxw and neighbouring Coast Salish peoples of Vancouver Island and the parts of the Gulf Islands of the southern Gulf of Georgia speak another dialect,  (usually spelled Hulquminum), often called the Straits dialect, or Island Halkomelem. It is not to be confused with North Straits Salish, which is a group of related dialects to the south.

In early 2018 the University of British Columbia installed at its main Vancouver campus 54 street signs in the Musqueam language, written in Americanist phonetic notation.  (In 2010, UBC’s Okanagan satellite campus had put up signs in Nsyilxcen, the language of the Okanagan Nation. Before the 2010 Olympic Games, the British Columbia government installed road signs in Squamish, Lil’wat and English on the Sea-to-Sky Highway between Whistler and Vancouver, BC.)

The  Musqueam dialect,  is from the  language family.

Indian Reserves 

Indian Reserves under the administration of the band are:
Musqueam Indian Reserve No. 2, at the mouth of the Fraser River to the north of Sea Island, 190.40 ha. 
Musqueam Indian Reserve No. 4, to the east of Canoe Passage near Westham Island, 57.30 ha. 
Sea Island Indian Reserve 3, on the northwest corner of Sea Island, 6.50 ha.

References

Citations

Sources

Further reading 
 Dunkley, Katharine. Indian Rights and Federal Responsibilities: Supreme Court Musqueam Decision. [Ottawa]: Library of Parliament, Research Branch, 1985.
 Guerin, Arnold, and J. V. Powell. Hunq̓umỉn̉um ̉= Musqueam Language. Book 1. [Vancouver, B.C.?]: Musqueam Band, 1975.
 Johnson, Elizabeth Lominska, and Kathryn N. Bernick. Hands of Our Ancestors: The Revival of Salish Weaving at Musqueam. [Vancouver?]: University of British Columbia, Museum of Anthropology, 1986. 
 Suttles, Wayne P. Musqueam Reference Grammar. First Nations languages. Vancouver: UBC Press, 2004. 
 Weightman, Barbara Ann. The Musqueam Reserve: A Case Study of the Indian Social Milieu in an Urban Environment. Seattle, Wash: University of Washington, 1978.

External links 
 Musqueam Band homepage
 History of the University of British Columbia

Coast Salish governments
First Nations governments in the Lower Mainland
Sea Island (British Columbia)